Sea Bright is a borough in Monmouth County, in the U.S. state of New Jersey. As of the 2020 United States census, the borough's population was 1,449, an increase of 37 (+2.6%) from the 2010 census count of 1,412, which in turn reflected a decline of 406 (−22.3%) from the 1,818 counted at the 2000 census.

Sea Bright was formed as a borough by an act of the New Jersey Legislature on March 21, 1889, from portions of Ocean Township, based on the results of a referendum held the previous day. The borough was reincorporated on March 10, 1897. Additional portions of Ocean Township were annexed by the borough in March 1909.

Some sources attribute the name to a suggestion made by Martha Bayard Stevens, The borough and other sources say that the borough was named for Sea Bright, England, though there is no evidence such a place exists. Earlier sources often spell it as one word, "Seabright", as seen in the United States Coast Guard's Station Seabright and the Seabright Lawn Tennis and Cricket Club.

History
In the early 1840s, the area of present-day Sea Bright was a fishing community of simple shacks near the beach dunes; Ocean House, the area's first hotel, opened in 1842, featuring access to fishing and sea bathing. The area was called "Nauvoo", a Native American word, meaning "bright sea". An alternative explanation, which the borough credits as the source, is that the name is derived from the Hebrew language meaning "pleasant place," which was the same name that Mormon leader Joseph Smith gave to Nauvoo, the Illinois town he founded in 1839. Smith is said to have visited Monmouth County during a missionary journey in 1840.

The first bridge across the Shrewsbury River connecting Sea Bright to Rumson was constructed in 1870. After several iterations of the bridge, Monmouth County has announced plans for a replacement of the existing span built in 1950 that connects to Ocean Avenue in Sea Bright with a new bridge that would be completed in 2020 at a site south of the current crossing.

The Sea Bright Skiff was developed on the Jersey Shore in the early 19th century for fishing offshore, by being launched through the surf and returned to shore.

Geography

According to the United States Census Bureau, the borough had a total area of 1.29 square miles (3.33 km2), including 0.72 square miles (1.86 km2) of land and 0.57 square miles (1.47 km2) of water (43.88%).

Sea Bright has seven members-only beach clubs, of which five are in the North Beach area: Ship Ahoy, Sands, Surfrider, Sea Bright Beach Club and Chapel Beach Club; and two are south of the center of town: Driftwood and Edgewater. These clubs charge thousands of dollars for membership and have waiting lists of several years for prospective members. In addition, there is a large public, municipal beach in the center of town, protected by lifeguards, with entry limited to those who have purchased a beach badge.  The traditional surfing beach area, called the Anchorage, is free and public, but unguarded.  In addition, there are numerous public access stairs to other unguarded beaches for fishing, recreation and suntanning.

Unincorporated communities, localities and place names within Sea Bright include Low Moor, Navesink Beach and Normandie. Sea Bright–Monmouth Beach Seawall runs the length of the town.

The borough borders the Monmouth County municipalities of Highlands, Middletown Township, Monmouth Beach and Rumson. Sea Bright is located on the barrier peninsula that separates the Atlantic Ocean from the Navesink and Shrewsbury rivers.

Demographics

2010 census

The Census Bureau's 2006–2010 American Community Survey showed that (in 2010 inflation-adjusted dollars) median household income was $74,236 (with a margin of error of +/− $8,921) and the median family income was $102,679 (+/− $37,943). Males had a median income of $84,412 (+/− $45,724) versus $72,898 (+/− $10,443) for females. The per capita income for the borough was $82,535 (+/− $20,263). About 3.5% of families and 4.8% of the population were below the poverty line, including 6.3% of those under age 18 and 2.7% of those age 65 or over.

2000 census
As of the 2000 United States census there were 1,818 people, 1,003 households, and 402 families residing in the borough. The population density was 2,846.9 people per square mile (1,096.8/km2). There were 1,202 housing units at an average density of 1,882.3 per square mile (725.1/km2). The racial makeup of the borough was 94.39% White, 1.76% African American, 2.26% Asian, 0.88% from other races, and 0.72% from two or more races. Hispanic or Latino of any race were 4.51% of the population.

There were 1,003 households, out of which 11.1% had children under the age of 18 living with them, 29.6% were married couples living together, 6.3% had a female householder with no husband present, and 59.9% were non-families. 45.4% of all households were made up of individuals, and 7.6% had someone living alone who was 65 years of age or older. The average household size was 1.81 and the average family size was 2.51.

In the borough the population was spread out, with 11.2% under the age of 18, 5.3% from 18 to 24, 41.5% from 25 to 44, 31.2% from 45 to 64, and 10.8% who were 65 years of age or older. The median age was 40 years. For every 100 females, there were 109.7 males. For every 100 females age 18 and over, there were 109.5 males.

The median income for a household in the borough was $65,563, and the median income for a family was $72,031. Males had a median income of $60,417 versus $41,100 for females. The per capita income for the borough was $45,066. About 5.3% of families and 7.6% of the population were below the poverty line, including 18.0% of those under age 18 and 3.7% of those age 65 or over.

Parks and recreation
As of the summer of 2015, the borough added lifeguards and began charging visitors a daily admission at Anchorage Beach, an area that has been widely used by surfers, eliminating one of the limited number of free oceanfront beaches in the state.

Government

Local government
Sea Bright is governed under the Borough form of New Jersey municipal government, which is used in 218 municipalities (of the 564) statewide, making it the most common form of government in New Jersey. The governing body is comprised of the Mayor and the Borough Council, with all positions elected at-large on a partisan basis as part of the November general election. A Mayor is elected directly by the voters to a four-year term of office. The Borough Council is comprised of six members elected to serve three-year terms on a staggered basis, with two seats coming up for election each year in a three-year cycle. The Borough form of government used by Sea Bright is a "weak mayor / strong council" government in which council members act as the legislative body with the mayor presiding at meetings and voting only in the event of a tie. The mayor can veto ordinances subject to an override by a two-thirds majority vote of the council. The mayor makes committee and liaison assignments for council members, and most appointments are made by the mayor with the advice and consent of the council.

, the Mayor of Sea Bright is Republican Brian P. Kelly, whose term of office ends December 31, 2023. Members of the Sea Bright Borough Council are Council President William J. "Jack" Keeler (R, 2024), Erwin W. Bieber (R, 2024), Kevin P. Birdsall (I, 2022), Jefferey M. Booker Sr. (R, 2023), Samuel A. Catalano (D, 2022) and John M. Lamia Jr. (R, 2023).

Federal, state and county representation
Sea Bright is located in the 6th Congressional District and is part of New Jersey's 13th state legislative district. Prior to the 2011 reapportionment following the 2010 Census, Sea Bright had been in the 11th state legislative district.

 

Monmouth County is governed by a Board of County Commissioners comprised of five members who are elected at-large to serve three year terms of office on a staggered basis, with either one or two seats up for election each year as part of the November general election. At an annual reorganization meeting held in the beginning of January, the board selects one of its members to serve as Director and another as Deputy Director. , Monmouth County's Commissioners are
Commissioner Director Thomas A. Arnone (R, Neptune City, term as commissioner and as director ends December 31, 2022), 
Commissioner Deputy Director Susan M. Kiley (R, Hazlet Township, term as commissioner ends December 31, 2024; term as deputy commissioner director ends 2022),
Lillian G. Burry (R, Colts Neck Township, 2023),
Nick DiRocco (R, Wall Township, 2022), and 
Ross F. Licitra (R, Marlboro Township, 2023). 
Constitutional officers elected on a countywide basis are
County clerk Christine Giordano Hanlon (R, 2025; Ocean Township), 
Sheriff Shaun Golden (R, 2022; Howell Township) and 
Surrogate Rosemarie D. Peters (R, 2026; Middletown Township).

Politics
As of March 2011, there were a total of 1,095 registered voters in Sea Bright, of which 248 (22.6%) were registered as Democrats, 305 (27.9%) were registered as Republicans and 541 (49.4%) were registered as Unaffiliated. There was one voter registered to another parties.

In the 2012 presidential election, Republican Mitt Romney received 57.7% of the vote (379 cast), ahead of Democrat Barack Obama with 41.1% (270 votes), and other candidates with 1.2% (8 votes), among the 659 ballots cast by the borough's 1,181 registered voters (2 ballots were spoiled), for a turnout of 55.8%. In the 2008 presidential election, Republican John McCain received 53.6% of the vote (483 cast), ahead of Democrat Barack Obama with 43.2% (389 votes) and other candidates with 1.7% (15 votes), among the 901 ballots cast by the borough's 1,220 registered voters, for a turnout of 73.9%. In the 2004 presidential election, Republican George W. Bush received 55.9% of the vote (519 ballots cast), outpolling Democrat John Kerry with 43.0% (399 votes) and other candidates with 1.2% (16 votes), among the 928 ballots cast by the borough's 1,282 registered voters, for a turnout percentage of 72.4.

In the 2013 gubernatorial election, Republican Chris Christie received 84.1% of the vote (348 cast), ahead of Democrat Barbara Buono with 14.7% (61 votes), and other candidates with 1.2% (5 votes), among the 418 ballots cast by the borough's 1,068 registered voters (4 ballots were spoiled), for a turnout of 39.1%. In the 2009 gubernatorial election, Republican Chris Christie received 66.2% of the vote (406 ballots cast), ahead of  Democrat Jon Corzine with 26.8% (164 votes), Independent Chris Daggett with 5.5% (34 votes) and other candidates with 1.0% (6 votes), among the 613 ballots cast by the borough's 1,148 registered voters, yielding a 53.4% turnout.

Education
Public school students in kindergarten through eighth grade are educated as part of the Oceanport School District after the former Sea Bright Board of Education was eliminated by the New Jersey Department of Education in 2009 as a non-operating district. As of the 2018–19 school year, the district, comprised of two schools, had an enrollment of 599 students and 61.0 classroom teachers (on an FTE basis), for a student–teacher ratio of 9.8:1. Schools in the district (with 2018–19 enrollment data from the National Center for Education Statistics) are 
Wolf Hill Elementary School with 342 students in pre-Kindergarten through 4th grade and 
Maple Place Middle School with 253 students in grades 5–8.

For ninth through twelfth grades, public school students attend Shore Regional High School, a regional high school that also serves students from the constituent districts of Monmouth Beach, Oceanport and West Long Branch. The high school is located in West Long Branch and is part of the Shore Regional High School District. As of the 2018–19 school year, the high school had an enrollment of 649 students and 57.2 classroom teachers (on an FTE basis), for a student–teacher ratio of 11.3:1.  Seats on the high school district's nine-member board of education are allocated based on the population of the constituent municipalities, with one seat assigned to Sea Bright.

Sea Bright high school students in public school also have the opportunity to attend the schools of the Monmouth County Vocational School District, including the five career academies.

Transportation

Roads and highways

New Jersey Route 36 is the main highway through Sea Bright. To the south, it connects the borough to Monmouth Beach. Heading north, it crosses the Shrewsbury River to Highlands via the Highlands – Sea Bright Bridge, a fixed span which was built between 2008 and 2011 to replace a  drawbridge built in 1932. Sea Bright can also be accessed from Rumson to the west via Rumson Road (County Route 520) over the Shrewsbury River Bridge.

Public transportation
NJ Transit provides local bus service between Sea Bright and Red Bank on the 835 route.

Climate

According to the Köppen climate classification system, Sea Bright has a humid subtropical climate (Cfa). Cfa climates are characterized by all months having an average temperature > , at least four months with an average temperature ≥ , at least one month with an average temperature ≥  and no significant precipitation difference between seasons. Although most summer days feature slight-to-moderate humidity and a cooling afternoon sea breeze in Sea Bright, episodes of heat and high humidity can occur with heat index values > . The average wettest month is July which correlates with the peak in thunderstorm activity. Episodes of extreme cold and wind can occur with wind chill values < .

Ecology

According to the A. W. Kuchler U.S. potential natural vegetation types, Sea Bright would have a dominant vegetation type of Northern Cordgrass (73) with a dominant vegetation form of Coastal Prairie (20). The average date of first spring leaf-out is March 23 and fall color typically peaks in early-November.

Notable people

People who were born in, residents of, or otherwise closely associated with Sea Bright include:

 Fred Alexander (1880–1969), top-ranked tennis player in the early 20th century
 James Waddell Alexander II (1888–1971), mathematician and topologist who was one of the first members of the Institute for Advanced Study (1933–1951), and also a professor at Princeton University (1920–1951)
 Linda Chorney (born 1960), singer-songwriter and award-winning filmmaker
 Tal Farlow (1921–1998), jazz guitarist
 Lindley Miller Garrison (1864–1932), United States Secretary of War from 1913 to 1916 during the Administration of President Woodrow Wilson
 Jerry Gaskill (born 1957), rock musician who is the drummer for the progressive metal band King's X
 John J. McCook (1845–1911), Civil War officer, prominent New York attorney and railroad executive
 Mildred Mottahedeh (1908–2000), collector of ceramics, businessperson, and philanthropist who cofounded Mottahedeh & Company, a designer and supplier of luxury porcelain
 Melissa Stark (born 1973), television personality and sportscaster who works as a reporter for the NFL Network
 Martha Bayard Stevens (1831–1899), philanthropist influential in advancing complementary educational pursuits, who has been credited with suggesting the borough's name
 Juan Trippe (1899–1981), airline entrepreneur and founder of Pan Am
 Charles L. Walters (–1894), politician who served for two years as mayor of Sea Bright and in the New Jersey General Assembly

References

External links

 Borough of Sea Bright official website
 Sea Bright Library
 Oceanport School District
 
 Oceanport School District, National Center for Education Statistics

 
1889 establishments in New Jersey
Borough form of New Jersey government
Boroughs in Monmouth County, New Jersey
Jersey Shore communities in Monmouth County
New Jersey District Factor Group none
Populated places established in 1889